Orchestra of the Swan is a British professional chamber orchestra based atWarwick Schools' Foundation in Warwick. It is Resident Orchestra at the Royal Birmingham Conservatoire, The Courtyard Hereford, Warwick Hall and the Stratford Play House with regular concert series at Number 8 Pershore and Cheltenham Town Hall. 

Founded in 1995 by David Curtis, the orchestra has been creatively led by Artistic Director David Le Page since 2018. It gives over 45 concerts annually and is increasing its overseas touring.  In 2014 the orchestra undertook its first highly successful tour to China. In 2016 The Swan performed at the Istanbul International Festival, and in 2017-18 toured to Mexico and New York (Carnegie Hall). The Swan has also toured the UK with groups such as Steve Harley & Cockney Rebel and James, with sell-out performances at London's Albert Hall.

Recordings and digital concerts have been Gramophone Choice, Album of the Week on Classic Fm and Scala Radio (UK) and Washington Public Radio and live concert recordings are frequently broadcast on USA Performance Today, in Canada and Australia.

New works 
The orchestra's extensive discography includes its most recent albums 'Timelapse' (Album of the Week on Classic FM and Scala Radio) and 'Labyrinths' (Album of the Week on Scala Radio) that meld classical repertoire with orchestral arrangements of popular songs which combined have audio streamed nearly 8 million times. Further recordings feature repertoire by Barber, Bax, Berlioz, Brahms, Copland, Debussy, Elgar, Finzi, Ireland, Mahler, Mendelssohn, Mozart, Schumann, Strauss, Vaughan Williams and the world premiere recording of the complete symphonies by Hans Gál  (1890-1987) conducted by Kenneth Woods.  The latter received outstanding critical acclaim and was featured on BBC Radio 3 ‘Composer of the Week’. In addition, Mendelssohn's D minor Violin Concerto with Tamsin Waley-Cohen was BBC Music Magazine's ‘Recommended Recording’.

Recordings of new work include Philip Sawyers' Symphonies, works for trumpet and orchestra by John McCabe, Robert Saxton and Deborah Pritchard and joint commissions with Kyo-Shin-An Arts of new work for koto, shakuhachi and chamber orchestra.

References

External links
 Official site

Culture in Warwickshire
Culture in Birmingham, West Midlands
English orchestras